Eastar Jet (ESR) is a South Korean low-cost airline with its headquarters in Banghwa-dong, Gangseo-gu, Seoul. On January 7, 2009, Eastar Jet made its maiden flight from  Gimpo International Airport to Jeju International Airport. Now, the airline operates a scheduled passenger network to 14 destinations in eight countries. Its main base is Gimpo International Airport, with a hub at Jeju International Airport.

Eastar Jet carried 3 million domestic passengers and 2.9 million international passengers in 2018. Its international traffic has doubled over the past three years and its domestic traffic has grown by nearly 50%, indicating a stronger focus on domestic growth while the other Korean low-cost carriers are focusing on the international market.

History
Eastar Jet was established on October 26, 2007, and acquired its air operator's certificate the following year on August 6. On January 7, 2009, Eastar Jet launched its first commercial flight from Seoul to Jeju with a Boeing 737. It commenced operations on its second route - Cheongju-Jeju - on June 12, 2009. Six months after, on December 24, 2009, Eastar Jet launched its first international flight from Incheon to Kuching, Malaysia. Within two years of commencing operations, the airline reached the 1 million mark in passengers carried on January 6, 2010.

The airline joined the U-FLY Alliance on July 27, 2016; it is the fifth member of the alliance.

On 2 March 2020, Jeju Air, one of the South Korean Low Cost Carrier has decided to take over management rights of Eastar Jet and signed a stock trading contract and Jeju Air acquires 51.17% stake of Eastar Jet cost of 54.5 billion won. and Jeju Air's M&A plan got approval from Fair Trade Commission of the Republic of Korea. However, on 23 July 2020, Jeju Air announced that it was to give up the acquisition of Eastar Jet due to economic uncertainty caused by the COVID-19 pandemic.

In August 2020, Eastar Jet push forward to re-mergers and acquisitions and selected three companies. Eastar Jet also began restructuring, the plan includes reduction of its fleet of 16 aircraft to 4 and reduce the labor force from 1,200 to 400, however, Jeju Air will rehire all of its dismissed staff.

On June 17, 2021, it was announced that Eastar Jet is set to be acquired for more than US$97 million by property developer and preferred bidder Sung Jung, following an auction for the airline. However, Sung Jung sells the entire stake of Eastar Jet to VIG Partners, private equity fund company on January 2023.

Destinations
, Eastar Jet flies to the following destinations:

Codeshare agreements 
The airline has a codeshare agreement with following airlines:

 Spring Airlines
 T'way Air

Fleet

Current fleet
, Eastar Jet operates an all-Boeing 737 fleet composed of the following aircraft:

Retired Fleet

Eastar Jet has previously operated the following aircraft types:

See also
List of low-cost airlines in South Korea
Air Busan 
Jeju Air
Jin Air

References

External links 

 

South Korean companies established in 2007
Low-cost carriers
Airlines of South Korea
Airlines established in 2007
Companies based in Seoul
South Korean brands
U-FLY Alliance